A dragonslayer is a person who slays dragons in mythology and fantasy.

Dragonslayer or Dragon Slayer may also refer to:

Books 
The Dragonslayer, a book in the Bone series
Dragon Slayers' Academy, a series of books
Dragonslayer (novel), by Wayland Drew, a novelization of the 1981 film
Dragonslayer, a book in the Wings of Fire novel series by Tui Sutherland

Films 
Dragonslayer (1981 film), a 1981 fantasy movie starring Peter MacNicol
Dragonslayer (2011 film), a documentary about skateboarder Josh "Skreech" Sandoval

Games 
Dragonslayer (board game), a 1981 board game
Dragon Slayer (series), a series of video games published by Nihon Falcom
Dragon Slayer (video game), the first game in the series, 1984
The working title of role-playing game DragonQuest

Music 
Dragonslayer (band), an English heavy metal band
Dragonslayer, erroneously said to be the previous name of the band Slayer
Dragonslayer (Dream Evil album), 2002
Dragonslayer (Sunset Rubdown album), 2009
"Dragon Slayer" (song), a 2014 song by Ninja Sex Party

Other uses 
Dragonslayers (Martian Metals), a 1980 line of miniatures
Dragon Slayer (roller coaster), located at Adventureland in Altoona, Iowa
Coach (Survivor contestant) (born 1971), reality TV personality who refers to himself as the "Dragon Slayer"
Dragon Slayer, a fictional sword wielded by Guts in the manga series Berserk